Khair  may refer to:

 Reer khair, A Dhulbahante subclan consisting of Jama Siad
 Khair, town in Uttar Pradesh, India
 Abul Khair Group – conglomerate in Bangladesh
 Khair Khaneh, archeological site in Afghanistan

See also
Khaira (disambiguation)